Chelsea Clark (1983- August 2, 2014) was a paralympic athlete from Canada who competed mainly in category T34 sprint events.

Biography
Clark competed in the 2004 Summer Paralympics in Athens where she won gold in the T34 100m and 200m.

She died of neuroblastoma on August 2, 2014, aged 31.

References

Athletes (track and field) at the 2004 Summer Paralympics
2014 deaths
Paralympic track and field athletes of Canada
Paralympic gold medalists for Canada
Medalists at the 2004 Summer Paralympics
Deaths from cancer in Ontario
Paralympic medalists in athletics (track and field)
1983 births